The Whitewater Valley Railroad is a heritage railroad in southeastern Indiana between Connersville and Metamora.

The railroad is dedicated to the preservation and presentation of a 1950s era of branch line railroading. It is now operated by vintage diesel switchers and road switchers during most of the year. Steam operations vary from year to year. The most recent steam locomotive donated to the organization is New York Central B-10W 0-6-0 #6894. It is nearly identical to the last steam engines operated on the line.

History

The Whitewater River formed a natural trade route for Native Americans and for early settlers. In 1836 the new state of Indiana approved funds to build the Whitewater Canal, following the river from Lawrenceburg, Indiana, all the way to Hagerstown, Indiana, . It was opened to Connersville, Indiana, in 1845. While improving trade for the area, it suffered from alternate droughts and floods, which carried away aqueducts and embankments. It was so damaged by floods in the later 1850s that residents petitioned the state to sell the right of way for a railroad.

In 1863 the Indianapolis and Cincinnati Railroad (I&C) acquired the right to build on the old towpath, although many portions of the canal remained open as a source of water power for mills such as the one still operating in Metamora. The canal remained open in Connersville until 1953, when Western Avenue was built over the top of it.

After the I&C purchased the canal right-of-way, its subsidiary, the White Water Valley Railroad (WVRR), reached Connersville in the spring of 1867, and continued on to Hagerstown in 1868.

Initially operated by the I&C, the WVRR operated independently for several years. In 1890 the WVRR was absorbed by the growing *Big Four* - the Cleveland, Cincinnati, Chicago & St. Louis. The Big Four (later the New York Central Railroad or NYC) operated commuter trains from Connersville and from Harrison, Ohio, into Cincinnati, and briefly operated through trains and parlor cars from Cincinnati to Fort Wayne, changing at Connersville to the tracks of the Lake Erie and Western Railroad.

The little used section between Connersville and Hagerstown was abandoned by the NYC 1931, with the track removed from this section in 1936, and all passenger service ended in 1933. Local freight continued behind steam locomotives until 1957, and behind diesel locomotives until discontinued by the NYC's successor, the Penn Central Railroad in 1972.

The formation of Conrail in 1976 saw that company provide rail service in Connersville; however the line was disconnected from the rest of the Conrail system.

The line between Metamora and Connersville was sold to the non-profit Whitewater Valley Railroad in 1984, although freight operation from Brookville to Valley Junction was taken over in 1979 by the Indiana and Ohio Railway. Freight service was abandoned on the Whitewater line between Brookville and Connersville in 1974. The portion of the remaining NYC branch between Connersville and Beeson's Station was sold to Indiana Hi-Rail Corporation in 1981.

Present operation
After a substantial washout closed the track between Metamora and Brookville in 1974, the Penn Central lifted  of track in 1976.

The remaining  of line from Connersville through Metamora were formally purchased by the Whitewater Valley in 1983, followed later by an additional  of track in Connersville that was no longer wanted by the Indiana Hi-Rail Corporation.

Operation of the heritage railroad has always been conducted entirely by volunteers, supplemented by a paid office manager. Track upgrading has been assisted by matching grants, totalling over $1.6 million since 1994. The railroad museum has rescued two historic railroad structures from the region including Dearborn Tower (NYC - B&O) from Lawrenceburg, Indiana, as well as the B&O Rushville, Indiana, passenger depot. These buildings are located on the south end of the Connersville Yard. The railroad proposes to install a turntable and roundhouse shelter to protect locomotives and other equipment from the weather in this general location along with providing space for other historic buildings. In 2012 the railroad constructed a ' restoration shop on the north end of the Connersville Yard.

The railroad operates passenger excursion trains pulled by historic diesel locomotives and open window Erie, New York Central, and Rock Island coaches on a regular schedule. These trains often include a caboose from the museum's collection. One route, the Valley Flyer, operates from Connersville to Metamora, while another operates as the Metamora Local, carrying passengers south on a  excursion along the restored canal, past the canal boat dock, a working aqueduct, and a restored lock. This train consist usually includes at least one caboose and a coach. During winter operations, trains operate with steam heat provided by a generator car formerly used by Via Rail.

Locomotives

Current roster

Former locomotives

Current operations

 Easter Bunny Train
 Weekend Train (Connersville, IN to Metamora, IN and return)
 Metamora Shuttle
 Wild West Train
 Pumpkin Train
 Fall Excursions
 Train to Dinner
 4 July Train
 Labor Day Steam Trips
 Santa Trains
 The Polar Express (November to December)

See also
 List of heritage railroads in the United States
 Whitewater Canal

External links
 Railroad website

Heritage railroads in Indiana
Tourist attractions in Fayette County, Indiana
Transportation in Fayette County, Indiana